The international breastfeeding community includes people who actively promote breastfeeding, teach breastfeeding, research breastfeeding and related health issues, and who write about breastfeeding and the ways it influences mothering, parenting and family life.

When La Leche League (LLL) was organized in 1956, it became a central place of contact for women looking for information, researchers and health professionals searching for peers, mothers hoping for encouragement and support, and writers wanting to connect with each other and share knowledge and insight.

As breastfeeding women began to join League and attend meetings they also became a willing market for publications about nursing and parenting. La Leche League conferences (local, national and international) created venues for speakers, for researchers to present their findings, and for new books to be released. As more women became college educated and entered the work force, they began to create new health fields, such as lactation consultation. Today, there are lactivists, women and men who actively promote the health benefits of breastfeeding for mothers, babies and communities, and who protest companies and corporations who discriminate against breastfeeding women.

With the development of the internet, individual women can share their breastfeeding experiences, sites can be created that address medical issues, research can be shared throughout the world, and governments can promote breastfeeding as a tool to improve the general health of their entire populations.

This list starts small, with the names of the founders of La Leche League, and then links to articles about the most well-known writers and researchers in the field of breastfeeding today. It includes the most authoritative sites with breastfeeding information, and some smaller sites that address important aspects of breastfeeding. The world health community encourages breastfeeding with sites aimed at a national and international audience.

The founders of La Leche League 

These are the founders of La Leche League, also known as the founding mothers:
 Mary Ann Cahill
 Edwina Froehlich
 Mary Ann Kerwin
 Viola Lennon
 Marian Tompson
 Betty Wagner
 Mary White

Very early supporters of La Leche League, as listed in the Second Edition of the Womanly Art of Breastfeeding, May 1963, include:

 Dr. Herbert Ratner, Dr. Gregory J. White, Dr. Niles Newton, Dr. E. Robbins Kimball
 Dr. Frank Howard Richardson, Dr. Grantly Dick-Read, Mrs. John Gale Aiken
 Ms Mildred Hatch, Mrs. Margaret Gamper R.N., Ms Joy Sidor, Ms Dorothy Vining
 Ms Mary B. Carson

Medical professionals working in the field today 

 Katherine Ann Dettwyler, former Adjunct Associate Anthropology Professor at the University of Delaware. She has been a lecturer, author and breastfeeding advocate. She wrote some of the first internet pages: Thoughts on Breastfeeding.
 Lawrence Gartner, professor emeritus, Departments of Pediatrics and Obstetrics/Gynecology University of Chicago, lead author of current American Academy of Pediatrics statement of Breastfeeding and the use of human milk
 Thomas W. Hale, R.Ph., Ph.D. Professor of Pediatrics, Texas Tech University School of Medicine  Author of Medications and Mother's Milk 
 Barbara Heiser, RN, BSN, IBCLC, Executive Director of the National Alliance for Breastfeeding Advocacy
 Sheila Kitzinger, taught workshops on the social anthropology of birth and breastfeeding 
 Chris Mulford, RN, LLL Leader, IBCLC. 
 Dr. Jack Newman, MD, Canadian physician specializing in breastfeeding support and advocacy
 Dr. William Sears, American pediatrician and the author or co-author of more than 30 parenting books with his wife, Martha, who is also a La Leche League Leader. They write and lecture about attachment parenting, and coined the phrase.
 Amy Spangler, American MN, RN and IBCLC who lectures extensively on the benefits of breastfeeding and has written several books on the nursing-related subjects.
 Pat Shelly, IBCLC, RNC, MA, Director of the Breastfeeding Center for Greater Washington.

Prominent authors on breastfeeding-related topics 
 Diana West, IBCLC, writer and lecturer on breastfeeding issues

Publications and organizations that actively support breastfeeding 
 Mothering – a holistic parenting magazine edited by Peggy O'Mara, a breastfeeding advocate
 La Leche League

Writings on politics and breastfeeding 
 The Politics of Breastfeeding — When Breasts Are Bad for Business by Gabrielle Palmer first published in 1988 and never out of print since
 Lactivism: How Feminists and Fundamentalists, Hippies and Yuppies, and Physicians and Politicians Made Breastfeeding Big Business and Bad Policy by Courtney Jung 2015
 Unlatched: The Evolution of Breastfeeding and the Making of a Controversy by Jennifer Grayson 2016
 Mother's Milk: Breastfeeding Controversies in American Culture by Bernice Hausman
 Milk, Money, and Madness: the culture and politics of breastfeeding by Naomi Baumslang & Dia Michels 2008
 Breastfeeding: Biocultural Perspectives by Patricia Stuart-Macadam & Katherine Dettwyler 1995

References

External links
 Best for Babes

Breastfeeding activists
Breastfeeding activists
Breastfeeding
Breastfeeding